Oxypselaphus obscurus is a species of beetle from family Carabidae, found everywhere in Europe except for Albania, Andorra, Croatia, Iceland, Malta, Monaco, North Macedonia, Portugal, Romania, San Marino, and Vatican City. The species are black coloured with yellow legs.

References

Platyninae
Beetles described in 1784
Beetles of Europe